is an FM radio station in Osaka, Japan. The station is an affiliate of Japan FM Network (JFN).

FM Osaka started broadcasting on April 1, 1970. It was the second commercial FM radio station to launch in Japan after FM Aichi. During its early years, FM Osaka transmitted from Mount Ikoma but later moved to Mount Iimori.

FM Osaka's main studios are located at "Minatomachi River Place" in Minato, Naniwa, Osaka, in use since July 22, 2002. Its previous studios was at the Asahi Shimbun Osaka Headquarters building in Nakanoshima.

See also
 List of radio stations in Japan
 aiko - one of FM Osaka's disc jockeys, started as a DJ before her singing career.

External links
 FM OSAKA 

Radio in Japan
Companies based in Osaka Prefecture
Mass media in Osaka